Numerous attacks were carried out by Palestinians near the illegal Israeli settlement of French Hill in northern East Jerusalem.

List of attacks
 On September 22, 1992, a border policeman, Avinoam Peretz, was killed at the junction. The gunman claimed he had been recruited by the Izz ad-Din al-Qassam Brigades.
 In July 1993, a car was hijacked in the junction by a Hamas terrorist, and the woman driving the car was killed.
 On February 26, 1996, a car was deliberately driven over a group of civilian pedestrians in the junction, killing civilian Flora Yehiel, 28, of Kiryat Ata.
 On March 27, 2001, 28 people were injured in a suicide bombing on a bus. Hamas claimed responsibility.
 On September 15, 2001, Meir Weisshaus, 23, of Jerusalem, was shot and killed in a drive-by shooting.
 On October 7, 2001, a civilian, Salomon Haim, was murdered.
 On November 4, 2001, two teenage residents were killed and 45 others were injured in a sub-machine gun attack by a Palestinian terrorist.
 On March 17, 2002, a suicide bombing of an Israeli bus in French Hill injured 25.
 On June 19, 2002, 2002 French Hill suicide bombing: a suicide bomber affiliated with the Al-Aqsa Martyrs' Brigades blew himself up at a crowded bus stop. Seven people were killed, most of them teenagers and children.
 On May 18, 2003, 2003 French Hill suicide bombing: a suicide bomber wearing an explosive belt detonated himself on a bus at the French Hill Junction. Seven Israelis were killed, and 20 were wounded.
 On March 19, 2004, George Khoury, son of Elias Khoury of Beit Hanina, was shot in a drive-by shooting while. The Fatah Al-Aqsa Martyrs Brigades claimed responsibility.
 On September 22, 2004, an 18-year-old female suicide bomber belonging to the Al-Aqsa Martyrs' Brigades killed 2 people and wounded 33 in the crowded bus station at the junction.

References

Suicide bombing in the Israeli–Palestinian conflict
Mass murder in 2003
Terrorist incidents in Jerusalem
Terrorist incidents in Asia in 1992
Terrorist incidents in Asia in 1993
Terrorist incidents in Asia in 1996
Terrorist incidents in Asia in 2001
Terrorist incidents in Asia in 2002
Terrorist incidents in Asia in 2003
Terrorist incidents in Asia in 2004
Terrorist incidents in Jerusalem in the 2000s
Terrorist incidents in Jerusalem in the 1990s
East Jerusalem